Kapur Chal or Kapurchal or Kopur Chal may refer to:
 Kapurchal, Gilan
 Kapur Chal, Mazandaran